Kaitlyn Christian and Sabrina Santamaria were the defending champions, but both players chose not to participate.

Anna Blinkova and Xenia Knoll won the title, defeating Beatriz Haddad Maia and Luisa Stefani in the final, 4–6, 6–2, [14–12].

Seeds

Draw

Draw

References
Main Draw

Open de Cagnes-sur-Mer - Doubles